Gunnar Jeannette (born May 5, 1982 in West Palm Beach, Florida) is an American racing driver who competes in the IMSA WeatherTech SportsCar Championship for WeatherTech Racing.  He won the 2011 American Le Mans Series season LMPC Drivers' Championship.

Early racing career
Jeannette started racing, driving in Historic Sports Car racing at the age of 16. He made the jump to the professional ranks less than one year later.

American Le Mans Series
Jeannette made his American Le Mans Series debut in 2000, scoring six top-10 finishes in seven starts in both the Prototype and GT classes. In 2002, he made his LMP900 class debut in a Panoz before moving to the factory supported JML Team Panoz squad in 2003, where he scored his best-ever overall finish of third (2nd in class) at Mosport.

For 2004, Jeannette moved back to GT2, piloting the Panoz Esperante GTLM for what turned out to be a three-year stint with two different teams. His best result was a fourth at Mosport and Petit Le Mans with co-driver Tommy Milner in 2006.

After making a handful of starts in 2008 for Corsa Motorsports, Jeannette returned to full-time ALMS competition in 2010 in the new LMPC class. Driving for his father's Green Earth Team Gunnar outfit, Jeannette became the first LMPC pole winner in series history. He went on to win four races with Elton Julian and finish 2nd in the Drivers Championship that year.

Jeannette joined CORE autosport for 2011 and continued his streak of success in LMPC, taking two wins, three pole positions and three fastest race laps en route to the LMPC Drivers Championship. He shared the honor with season-long co-driver Ricardo Gonzalez and Genoa Racing's Eric Lux, who ended up on equal points to the CORE autosport duo.

24 Hours of Le Mans
At the age of 18, Jeannette became the youngest-ever driver to finish the 24 Hours of Le Mans, in his race debut in 2000. He's since competed an additional seven times, with a best finish of fifth overall in 2003.

Grand-Am
Jeannette made his debut in the Grand-Am Rolex Sports Car Series GTU class at the 2000 Rolex 24 at Daytona. He won his first-ever Rolex Series race one year later in the GTS class and has since made sporadic starts in the series.

In 2005, Jeannette ran his first full season in the Continental Tire Sports Car Challenge, finishing sixth in GS Points Standings with two victories to his credit driving for Multimatic Motorsports. He returned to full-time competition in 2010 with co-driver Frankie Montecalvo, finishing 10th in the GS class championship.

For 2012, Jeannette rejoined Multimatic Motorsports for its new Street Tuner-class Ford Focus ST-R development program.

FIA World Endurance Championship
Jeannette made his FIA World Endurance Championship debut in the Six Hours of Spa-Francorchamps on May 5, 2012, co-driving the No. 58 Luxury Racing Ferrari F458 Italia with Frankie Montecalvo and Pierre Ehret to a fifth-place finish in the GTE-Am class. The trio did not finish the 2012 24 Hours of Le Mans after suffering an accident during the overnight hours.

24H Series
Jeannette made his 24H Series return, at the first round of 2021 in the Dubai 24 Hour at the Dubai Autodrome for Simpson Motorsport in a Audi RS3 LMS TCR. He had previously raced in 2013 in a Ferrari 458 Italia GT3 for Ram Racing.

Personal life
Jeannette is an avid extreme sporting enthusiast. Since 2004, he's racked up more than 1,500 skydives and 200 BASE jumps from all corners of the globe. Jeannette has also participated in world record skydives and has been featured on MTV, People Magazine, USA Today and several other local and national publications.

24 Hours of Le Mans results

Complete IMSA SportsCar Championship results
(key) (Races in bold indicate pole position)

† Jeannette did not complete sufficient laps in order to score full points.

References

External links

1982 births
Living people
Sportspeople from West Palm Beach, Florida
Rolex Sports Car Series drivers
American Le Mans Series drivers
Racing drivers from Florida
Racing drivers from Miami
24 Hours of Le Mans drivers
FIA World Endurance Championship drivers
European Le Mans Series drivers
24 Hours of Daytona drivers
WeatherTech SportsCar Championship drivers
24H Series drivers
GT World Challenge America drivers
Multimatic Motorsports drivers
Larbre Compétition drivers
Rowe Racing drivers
Greaves Motorsport drivers
AF Corse drivers
Michelin Pilot Challenge drivers
Le Mans Cup drivers